An  is a type of corporation which existed under Japanese law from 2002 until 2008.

The intermediary corporation was designed to bridge the gap between companies which work for profits and NGO and other nonprofit organizations which work for public interest. Prior to the enforcement of the law on April 1, 2002, excepting the labor union whose establishing rules were regulated under specific laws, voluntary groups such as a condo association board and hobby club were operated under informal agreements and their assets were registered with one or more of group members. However, this meant that in the absence or negligence of the goodwill by the member registering assets, group's assets could be appropriated without becoming a criminal case. While they could be reclaimed through a civil suit, this does not resolve the problem of the ownership of assets. The intermediary corporation and its associated laws were designed to protect the group's assets while limiting the potential of lawsuits against individual members.

There were two types of intermediary corporations.  were designed to resemble yūgen kaisha (limited companies) in formation and function, while  were closer to  gomei kaisha (general partnership corporations).

See also

Kabushiki kaisha
Godo kaisha
Mochibun kaisha

External links

  Ministry of Justice page on intermediary corporations

Japanese business law
Japanese business terms
Types of business entity
Corporations